Reefton is a bounded rural locality in Victoria, Australia, on the Warburton Woods Point Road, located within the Shire of Yarra Ranges local government area. Reefton recorded a population of 102 at the 2021 census.

The Upper Yarra Reservoir lies within the locality.

History
Reefton Post Office opened on 1 February 1877 and closed in 1886.

References

Towns in Victoria (Australia)
Yarra Valley
Yarra Ranges